Bashundhara Ad-din Medical College (BAMC) is a private medical college located in Bashundhara Riverview Project at Hasnabad in Keraniganj, Bangladesh. It was jointly funded by Bashundhara Group and Akij Group, and is run by Ad-din Foundation. BAMC was established in 2008. It has affiliation to University of Dhaka.

References

Keraniganj Upazila
Medical colleges in Bangladesh